Pope Pius X created 50 cardinals in seven consistories. Twenty of them were Italians. He created 17 cardinals at four consistories over four years from 1903 to 1907 and then, after several postponements and allowing the membership of the College of Cardinals to fall to 47, created 19 cardinals in 1911, announcing 18 and reserving the name of one, the largest number of cardinals at a single consistory in a century.

Those he made cardinals included Giacomo della Chiesa, who succeeded him as Pope Benedict XV in 1914, Arcoverde, the first from Brazil and the first born in Latin America, and van Rossum, the first from the Netherlands in centuries. He created just one cardinal in pectore.

9 November 1903

Pope Pius created two cardinals at a secret consistory on 9 November 1903, both Italians. They and three cardinals created at Pope Leo XIII's last consistory the previous June received their red galeros and their titular church assignments at a public consistory on 12 November. Press accounts differ dramatically in their accounts of Pius' first public consistory. According to The Tablet, Pius used the occasion to launch his campaign to eliminate applause from religious celebrations, Pius was not carried on the sedia gestatoria as was traditional. He arrived on foot wearing a cope and mitre at the end of the procession of prelates "almost hidden behind the double line of Palatine Guards through which he passed". The New York Times, on the other hand, described the "perfect storm of applause" that greeted the pope "borne high in the sedia gestatoria by eight scarlet-clad sediari, flanked by the great feather fans, giving a mediaeval tone to the scene".
 Rafael Merry del Val (1865–1930)
 Giuseppe Callegari (1841–1906)

11 December 1905
Pius created four cardinals on 11 December 1905, one each from Brazil, Hungary, Italy, and Spain. Three belonged to the order of cardinal priests and one (Cagiano de Acevedo) to the order of cardinal deacons. Afterwards, Pius gave Arcoverde and Cagiano de Azevedo their cardinal's rings. Customarily only new cardinals resident in Rome were on hand to participate in the public consistory following immediately upon the secret consistory where they were created cardinals. The presence of Arcoverde is an exception. He was the first Brazilian cardinal and the first cardinal born in Latin America.
 József Samassa (1828–1912)
 Marcelo Spinola y Maestre (1835–1906)
 Joaquim Arcoverde de Albuquerque Cavalcanti (1850–1930)
 Ottavio Cagiano de Azevedo (1845–1927)

15 April 1907

Pope Pius created seven cardinals, all cardinal priests, on 15 April 1907. Three days later he gave the cardinal's red galero and titular church assignments to Cavallari, Lorenzelli, Maffi, Lualdi, and Mercier. The other two, both living in Spain, waited for theirs until 19 December 1907. This increased the number of cardinals to 62, of whom 37 were Italian.

 Aristide Cavallari (1849–1914)
 Gregorio Maria Aguirre y Garcia (1835–1913)
 Aristide Rinaldini (1844–1920)
 Benedetto Lorenzelli (1853–1915)
 Pietro Maffi (1858–1931)
 Alessandro Lualdi (1858–1927)
 Désiré-Joseph Mercier (1851–1926)

16 December 1907
Pope Pius created four cardinals in 1907, two Italian and two French; three were cardinal priests and one (de Lai) a cardinal deacon. They received their titular assignments and red galeros at the public consistory three days later, where Pope Pius spoke at length about the persecution of the Church by the French government.
 Pietro Gasparri (1852–1934)
 Louis Luçon (1842–1930)
 Pierre Andrieu (1849–1935)
 Gaetano de Lai (1853–1928)

27 November 1911

Since 1907, several consistories for the creation of cardinals were announced and postponed; by late October 1911 the number of living cardinals had fallen to 47. On the morning of 27 November 1911 at a secret consistory Pius created eighteen new cardinals plus an additional one created in pectore, that is, not identified. That afternoon at a public consistory he announced the names of 18. Five were Italians and four French. Speculation about the one not identified centered on the Patriarch of Lisbon, António Mendes Belo, since the Portuguese Republic established in 1910 had adopted severely anticlerical policies and exiled Mendes Belo from Lisbon for violating its law on the separation of church and state. American representation in the College grew from one to three. Another, Diomede Falconio, was an Italian-born U.S. citizen who had spent most of his career in the United States and Canada. Van Rossum was the first cardinal from the Netherlands since Willem van Enckevoirt in 1523.

Thirteen of the eighteen new cardinals attended another public consistory on 30 November, where Pius bestowed their cardinals' hats and assigned them their titular churches and deaconries. He praised the public demonstrations that greeted his appointments in the United States and he again addressed the "weight of persecution" in France.
 António Mendes Belo (1842–1929), created cardinal in pectore, announced 25 May 1914
 José Cos y Macho (1838–1919)
 Diomede Falconio (1842–1917)
 Antonio Vico (1847–1929)
 Gennaro Granito Pignatelli di Belmonte (1851–1948)
 John Murphy Farley (1842–1918)
 Francis Bourne (1861–1935)
 Franziskus von Sales Bauer (1841–1915)
 Léon-Adolphe Amette (1850–1920)
 William Henry O'Connell (1859–1944)
 Enrique Almaraz y Santos (1847–1922)
 François-Virgile Dubillard (1845–1914)
 Franz Xaver Nagl (1855–1913)
 François de Rovérié de Cabrières (1830–1921)
 Gaetano Bisleti (1856–1932)
 Giovanni Lugari (1846–1914)
 Basilio Pompili (1858–1931)
 Louis Billot (1846–1931), resigned from the College in 1927
 Willem Marinus van Rossum (1854–1932)

2 December 1912

On 2 December 1912, Pope Pius first bestowed cardinals' regalia on several cardinals created at the previous consistory: Nagl, Cos y Macho, Vico, Bauer, Almarez y Santos. He then created one cardinal in a secret consistory and named a papal legate to inform him and deliver his cardinal's insignia.
 Károly Hornig (1840–1917)

25 May 1914

On 26 April 1914, Pope Pius announced he would create 13 new cardinals at a 25 May consistory. On that day he created nine of the order of cardinal priests and four cardinal deacons. He also told the consistory he had made Mendes Belo a cardinal in pectore in November 1911. Three days later he gave red galeros and assigned churches and deaconries to ten of them. The others–Guisasola y Menéndez, Csernoch, Piff, and Mendes Belo–received their cardinals' galeros and titular church assignments from his successor Pope Benedict XV on 8 September 1914, a month after he was elected pope. 
 Victoriano Guisasola y Menéndez (1852–1920)
 Louis-Nazaire Bégin (1840–1925)
 Domenico Serafini (1852–1918)
 Giacomo della Chiesa (1854–1922)
 János Csernoch (1852–1927)
 Franziskus von Bettinger (1850–1917)
 Hector Sévin (1852–1916)
 Felix von Hartmann (1851–1919)
 Friedrich Gustav Piffl (1864–1932)
 Scipione Tecchi (1854–1915)
 Filippo Giustini (1852–1920)
 Michele Lega (1860–1935)
 Francis Aidan Gasquet (1846–1929)

Notes

References

Additional sources

External links

Pius X
20th-century Catholicism
Pope Pius X
College of Cardinals